Monster High: Ghoul Spirit is a 2011 party video game developed by ImaginEngine and published by THQ for the Nintendo DS and the Wii consoles based on Monster High by Mattel.

The game was later re-issued in 2014 by Little Orbit for the North American market.

Gameplay

Reviews
Common Sense Media
Diehard GameFan
Jeuxvideo.com
TechnologyTell
Jeuxvideo.com

References

External links
 (Little Orbit; Archived)

2011 video games
Monster High
Nintendo DS games
Party video games
Video games scored by Adam Gubman
Wii games
THQ games
Video games developed in the United States
Single-player video games
ImaginEngine games